This is a list of all the golfers who represented the United States in the Solheim Cup from the first staging in 1990 through to 2021.

Players 

+ Selected or qualified for the team but withdrew and was replaced.
* Heather Bowie later became Heather Bowie Young. Dottie Pepper was called Dottie Mochrie from 1990 to 1994. Ally Ewing played as Ally McDonald in 2019.

Playing record 
Source:

O = Overall, S = Singles matches, Fs = Foursome matches, Fb = Fourball matches
W = Matches won, L = Matches lost, H = Matches halved

Record American appearances 
Up to and including the 2021 Solheim Cup.

Laura Davies of England holds the record for most appearances, 12, in the Solheim Cup by either a European or an American.

Record American point winners 
Up to and including the 2021 Solheim Cup.

Family relationships

Jessica Korda and Nelly Korda are sisters. They played together in the 2019 and 2021 Solheim Cups.

See also

Golf in the United States
List of European Solheim Cup golfers
Lists of golfers

References

External links
The Solheim Cup History & Results
About.com golf Solheim Cup Records

 
Solheim, American
 
Solheim Cup
Golf
Solheim